Golf is a sport.

Golf or GOLF may also refer to:

Games

 Golf (billiards),  a pocket billiards game that allows more than two people to play
 Golf (card game),  a card game where players try to earn the lowest number of points
 Golf (patience), a solitaire card game
 Golf (1979 video game), released by Magnavox for the Videopac console
 Golf (1980 video game), released for the Atari 2600
 Golf (1984 video game), released by Nintendo in 1984 for the Nintendo Entertainment System
 Golf (1995 video game), released for Virtual Boy game console, and published by T&E Soft in Japan and published by Nintendo in North America

Media
 Golf (film), a 1922 film starring Oliver Hardy
 Golf Channel, an American cable TV network focused on the sport of golf
 Golf Magazine, a monthly golf magazine

Places
 Golf, Florida, a village in Palm Beach County
 Golf, Illinois, a village in Cook County
 Golf, Belgrade, a neighborhood of Belgrade, Serbia

Other uses
 Volkswagen Golf, a car model built by the German manufacturer Volkswagen
 Golf-class submarine, used by the Soviet Navy
 Golf Wang, an American clothing company founded by Tyler, the Creator
 Global Oscillations at Low Frequencies, an instrument used by the Solar and Heliospheric Observatory
 Code word for the letter G in the NATO spelling alphabet

See also
 Perl golf, a game involving the Perl programming language
 Word golf, a word game
 Code golf, a competition by programmers to write the least amount of code necessary to implement a particular algorithm
 Disc golf, or frisbee golf
 Miniature golf, minigolf or crazy golf
 Gulf (disambiguation)